Simon Pegg is an English actor, comedian, screenwriter, and producer. He came to public prominence in the UK as the co-creator of the sitcom Spaced, directed by Edgar Wright. He went on to co-write and star in the Three Flavours Cornetto film trilogy: Shaun of the Dead (2004), Hot Fuzz (2007), and The World's End (2013). He and frequent collaborator Nick Frost wrote and starred in the sci-fi film Paul (2011). He is also known for the role of Montgomery "Scotty" Scott in the Star Trek reboot film series Star Trek (2009), Star Trek Into Darkness (2013), Star Trek Beyond (2016).

He first appeared as Benji Dunn in the third installment film Mission: Impossible III (2006), and went on to reprise the role in Mission: Impossible – Ghost Protocol (2011), Mission: Impossible – Rogue Nation (2015), Mission: Impossible – Fallout (2018), and the upcoming films Mission: Impossible – Dead Reckoning Part One (2023) and Part Two (2024). He has lent his voice to the animated character Buck in the Ice Age film series, namely Ice Age: Dawn of the Dinosaurs (2009), Scrat's Continental Crack-up (2011), Ice Age: Collision Course (2016), and The Ice Age Adventures of Buck Wild (2022), the latter of which made him the only cast member to reprise a role from previous films.

As a director he has only one credit, directing the parody music video Au Revoir Chris Hemsworth, which is a parody of the song Chick Habit. The song was sung by Pom Klementieff and it was written for the Russo Brother's AGBO Superhero League Week.

Film

Television

Video games

Director

References

External links

Male actor filmographies
British filmographies